Mike Mitchell is a former Ohio Representative who represented the 26th District, based out of Columbus, Ohio.

See also
Election Results, U.S. Senator from Ohio

References
 "Notable Former Volunteers / Education". Peace Corps official site. Accessed 5 January 2007.

Peace Corps volunteers
Democratic Party members of the Ohio House of Representatives
Living people
21st-century American politicians
Year of birth missing (living people)